Accurate knitting needle and crochet hook sizing is important for both crafts. There are, however, no uniform procedures for indicating these measurements.

The Craft Yarn Council of America (CYCA), an industry trade association, has collated a table of crochet hook and knitting needle sizes from de facto industrial standards and elicited the cooperation of its member organizations in adopting them to regularize sizing in the United States. The listed gauge systems are also widely used internationally. Their broader applicability is further highlighted by their normalization with the metric system, which the CYCA members have agreed to have appear prominently on their packaging.

A hook gauge is used for measuring both knitting needles and crochet hooks. The size of a crochet hook is determined by the diameter of its shaft.

Standard knitting needle and crochet hook sizes

References 

Crochet
Knitting
Mechanical standards
Standards of the United States

External links

Craft Yarn Council of America